Kvitko is a gender-neutral Slavic surname. Notable people with the surname include:

Anastasia Kvitko (born 1994), Russian glamour model and entrepreneur
Leib Kvitko (1890–1952), Yiddish poet

See also
 

Russian-language surnames
Ukrainian-language surnames